Ardquin is a civil parish and townland (of 190 acres) in County Down, Northern Ireland. It is situated in the historic barony of Ards Upper.

Townlands
Ardquin civil parish contains the following townlands:

Ardquin
Ballyhenry
Ballyhenry Island
Ballyherly
Ballyminnish
Ballymurphy
Ballyridley
Ballywaddan
Ballywallon
Ballywallon Island
Ballywhite
Demesne
Marlfield
Priest Town
Thomastown

See also
List of civil parishes of County Down

References